State Route 104 (SR 104) is a  state highway located in Kennebec and Somerset counties in central Maine. Its southern terminus is at SR 8, SR 11 and SR 27 in Augusta.  Its northern terminus is at U.S. Route 2 (US 2), US 201 and US 201A in Skowhegan.

Route description 
SR 104 begins at SR 8/SR 11/SR 27 at the intersection of Bond Street and State Street / Mount Vernon Avenue in downtown Augusta. After traveling one block east along Bond Street, SR 104 proceeds north along Water Street and the west bank of the Kennebec River. It then intersects SR 3. As it enters Waterville, it intersects SR 137 and SR 11, with which SR 104 has a [[concurrency (road). Then after crossing the Messalonskee Stream, SR 137 breaks off to the south on Carter Memorial Drive and SR 137 Business (SR 137 Bus.) begins.

Through Waterville, SR 11/SR 104/SR 137 Bus. travel northeast along Silver Street. SR 11 and SR 104 turn onto Elm Street into the city's business district. At a junction with Elm Street, Main Street, and College Avenue, SR 104 branches off of SR 11 and travels north on Main Street. The southbound direction of US 201 and SR 100 also pass through this intersection but do not form concurrencies with SR 104. North of the downtown area, it has an interchange with Interstate 95 at its exit 130. Starting in Fairfield, SR 104 has a  concurrency with SR 139. There is also an intersection with SR 23 which has a  concurrency with the SR 104/SR 139. SR 104 then branches off of SR 139 in North Fairfield.

History 

The southern terminus of SR 104 was originally located at the roundabout where State Street, Memorial Drive and Western Avenue meet (along with seven different numbered routes, not including SR 104) in downtown Augusta, a terminus it shared with SR 8. SR 104 was cosigned with SR 8, SR 11 and SR 27 northbound along State Street before splitting at Bond Street onto its current alignment.  

Major intersections

References

External links

Floodgap Roadgap's RoadsAroundME: Maine State Route 104

104
Transportation in Kennebec County, Maine
Transportation in Somerset County, Maine